The 2003–04 Primeira Liga was the 70th edition of top flight of Portuguese football. It started 16 August 2003 with an opening game between Académica de Coimbra and Sporting Clube de Portugal, and ended on 9 May 2004. It was contested by 18 teams. FC Porto were the defending champions and became champions again, winning the Portuguese title in two consecutive seasons.

The first goal of the season was scored by Académica's Filipe Alvim in the opening game against Sporting CP. The first red card of the season was given to Paços de Ferreira's Portuguese midfielder Pedrinha in the 3rd game of the season against Nacional and the first yellow card was given to Sporting's Portuguese midfielder Custódio in the opening game of the season. Porto's Benni McCarthy was the top scorer of the season, scoring 20 goals.

Porto qualified for the 2004–05 UEFA Champions League group stage, along with Benfica, who qualified for the third round. Sporting, Nacional, Braga and Marítimo qualified for the 2004–05 UEFA Cup; in opposite, Alverca, Paços de Ferreira and Estrela da Amadora were relegated to the Segunda Liga.

Promotion and relegation
Teams relegated to Segunda Liga
Varzim
Santa Clara
Vitória de Setúbal

Varzim, Santa Clara, and Vitória de Setúbal were consigned to the Liga de Honra following their final classification in 2002–03 season.

Teams promoted from Segunda Liga
Rio Ave
Alverca
Estrela da Amadora

The other three teams were replaced by Rio Ave, Alverca, Estrela da Amadora from Segunda Liga.

Teams

Team summaries

Managerial changes

League table

Results

Statistics

Top goal scorers

Hat-tricks

Awards

Monthly awards

Annual awards
Portuguese Silver Boot
The Portuguese Silver Boot award was won by the South African Benni McCarthy of Porto, by scoring 20 goals.

References

External links
Portuguese Liga 2003-04 at rsssf.com

Primeira Liga seasons
Port
1